The Army of the Duchy of Warsaw (Polish: Armia Księstwa Warszawskiego)  refers to the military forces of the Duchy of Warsaw. The Army was significantly based on the Polish Legions; it numbered about 30,000 and was expanded during wartime to almost 100,000. It was composed of infantry with a strong cavalry force supported by artillery. The Napoleonic customs and traditions resulted in some social tensions, but are generally credited with helpful modernization and useful reforms.

Size
The cadre of the Army of the Duchy of Warsaw was formed by the legionnaires of the Polish Legions. In addition, it was filled by older soldiers from the Army of the Polish–Lithuanian Commonwealth, who responded to the call to arms of Józef Poniatowski, and patriotic youth. In 1808, after the first emergency period was over, and the duchy felt more secure, those who wished to leave the army were given leave. The army was expanded with large waves of new recruits on the eve of new wars in 1809 and 1812, when the duchy fought other partitioners, which resulted in an influx of recruits from those territories, hoping to see their home liberated. The final recruitment phase was that in the fall and winter of 1813, when the duchy was trying to rally to its own defense in the aftermath of Napoleon's defeat in Russia.

Upon its creation, the Army numbered 30,000 (out of the duchy's population of 2.6m). The size of the army was a considerable economic burden to the small state. The army was expanded several times; it was doubled in 1809. Several regiments were sponsored by the French. For the war of 1812, almost 100,000 men were fielded – more than the Army of the Polish–Lithuanian Commonwealth ever numbered. In the fall of 1813, the Army, reconstructed after the defeat in Russia, numbered about 20,000 or 40,000 (sources vary).

It is estimated that about 180,000 to 200,000 men served in the Army throughout its brief existence. In addition to the Army of the Duchy of Warsaw, Poles also served in other formations allied to France; most notably, the Vistula Legion. In addition to the standing army, a national guard could be called into action, as happened in 1809 and 1811.

Notable Polish commanders of the Army of the Duchy of Warsaw included Prince Józef Poniatowski (who was the army chief commander throughout most of its history) and Jan Henryk Dąbrowski.

Composition

The Army of the Duchy of Warsaw was composed of the following formations:
 one regiment of cuirassiers (14th)
 ten regiments of uhlan lancers (2nd, 3rd, 6th, 7th, 8th, 9th, 11th, 12th, 15th, 16th); five more were formed in Lithuania in 1812
 two regiments of hussars (10th and 13th)
 three regiments of chasseurs (1st, 4th and 5th)
 seventeen regiments of infantry (numbered one through seventeen; five more were formed in Lithuania in 1812)
 one regiment of horse artillery (composed of four companies)
 twenty five companies of regular artillery

In 1813 several units of light cavalry, the Krakusi (Cracus, or Polish cossacks), were planned; in the end, one regiment was formed.

Culture, training and time of service

The Army was the site of a cultural clash of new, democratic French traditions and old Polish customs, with clashes on the role of nobility in the military – with some conservatives attempting to restrict the officer rank to the nobles. The French revolutionary and civic traditions, passed through veteran legionnaires, resulted in more motivation of the peasant recruits, compared to the army of the old Commonwealth. The educational role of the army is seen as one of its major if unintended successes. The army was also improved due to the modernization and adoption of modern French military rules and tactics. Overall, the era of the Duchy of Warsaw marked a period of modernization of the Polish Army, with a new military doctrine and science that was codified by Polish military scholar of that era, Ignacy Prądzyński.

The obligatory time of service was set at 6 years, with any citizens aged 21 to 28 having a chance to be randomly chosen for conscription. The Army was supported by the new schools, with the 3-year Elementary School and a 1-year Applicant School for Artillery and Engineering.

Overall, the Polish units were reckoned by the French to be highly motivated and of high quality.

Operational history

The army was formed at the time of the creation of the Duchy of Warsaw in 1807. The army participated in numerous wars on the side of Napoleonic France, including in the War of the Fourth Coalition (1806–1807), Peninsular War, the War of the Fifth Coalition (primarily in the Polish–Austrian War) of 1809, and in the War of the Sixth Coalition (in particular, in the French invasion of Russia) of 1812–1813. In the Russian campaign of 1812, the Polish units formed an entire corps (the V Corps) of the Grande Armée. The army sustained over 70% losses. The Army suffered further heavy casualties in the battle of Leipzig in 1813, where Prince Poniatowski died. After Napoleonic defeats in 1813, the duchy was occupied by Napoleon's enemies. As several garrisons in fortresses held out, much of the Army followed Napoleon back to France that year. Disorganized after Poniatowski's death, in 1814, the army still had about 8,000 people in French-controlled territories, mostly in France, but was incorporated into the French Army, and ceased to exist after the final defeat of Napoleon. After the Treaty of Fontainebleau most of the Polish soldiers were given into the custody of the Russians.

See also
 Army of the Congress Poland
 Military of the Polish–Lithuanian Commonwealth
 Polish Armed Forces

References

Military history of Poland
Military units and formations established in 1807
Military units and formations disestablished in 1814
Duchy of Warsaw
Former armies by country
Military units and formations of the Napoleonic Wars
Duchy of Warsaw